Anthony Shaquille Brown   (born December 15, 1993) is an American football cornerback who is currently a free agent. He played college football at Purdue.

Early years
Brown attended Hillsborough High School, where he played football. He was a two-year starter and received second-team All-Hillsborough County honors. As a junior, he tallied 69 tackles, one interception, one pass defensed and four receptions for 52 yards. In his last year he was a two-way player, posting 25 tackles, two interceptions, three passes defensed, 911 rushing yards, 14 rushing touchdowns, 18 receptions for 239 yards and one touchdown. He also practiced track.

College career
Brown accepted a scholarship from Purdue University. He became a starter as a sophomore, registering 69 tackles (second on the team), 3 tackles for loss, 3 passes defensed and one forced fumble. The next year, he posted 54 tackles (fifth on the team), 5.5 tackles for loss, 1.5 sacks, 10 passes defensed, and one fumble recovery. As a senior, he made 60 tackles (fourth on the team), 4 interceptions (first interceptions of his career) and 6 passes defensed.

College statistics

Professional career

2016
The Dallas Cowboys selected Brown in the sixth round with the 189th overall pick in the 2016 NFL Draft. Brown was the 27th cornerback drafted in 2016.

On May 18, 2016, the Dallas Cowboys signed Brown to a four-year, $2.47 million contract that includes a signing bonus of $134,947.

Throughout training camp, Brown competed to be a backup cornerback against Josh Thomas, Isaiah Frey, Dax Swanson, and Deji Olatoye. Head coach Jason Garrett named Brown the fourth cornerback on the depth chart to start the regular season. He began the season behind Brandon Carr, Morris Claiborne, and Orlando Scandrick.

He made his professional regular season debut in the Dallas Cowboys’ season-opener against the New York Giants and made one solo tackle during their 20–19 loss. On September 25, 2016, Brown earned his first career start in place of Orlando Scandrick who was inactive due to a hamstring injury. Brown finished the Cowboys’ 31–17 victory against the Chicago Bears with four combined tackles. In Week 6, he collected a season-high 11 combined tackles (ten solo) during a 30–16 win at the Green Bay Packers. Brown began to see extended play beginning in Week 9 of the season after Morris Claiborne sustained a groin injury the previous week. On December 11, 2016, Brown recorded two solo tackles, broke up a pass, and made his first career interception as the Cowboys lost 10–7 at the New York Giants in Week 14. Brown intercepted a pass attempt by Giants’ quarterback Eli Manning, that was originally intended for wide receiver Victor Cruz in the fourth quarter. He finished his rookie season in 2016 with 55 combined tackles (40 solo), eight pass deflections, and one interception in 16 games and nine starts.

The Dallas Cowboys finished first in the NFC East with a 13–3 record and earned a first round bye. On January 15, 2017, Brown recorded one tackle during a 34–31 loss to the Green Bay Packers in the NFC Divisional Round.

2017
Brown entered training camp as a possible candidate to win the role as a starting cornerback after Brandon Carr departed in free agency. He competed against Orlando Scandrick, Nolan Carroll, Chidobe Awuzie, and Jourdan Lewis. Head coach Jason Garrett named Brown the fourth cornerback on the depth chart to begin the regular season, behind Orlando Scandrick, Nolan Carroll, and Chidobe Awuzie.

He appeared in the Dallas Cowboys’ season-opener against the New York Giants on Sunday Night Football and recorded one solo tackle, broke up a pass, and intercepted a pass by Giants’ quarterback Eli Manning in the fourth quarter of their 19–3 victory. The following week, he collected a season-high seven solo tackles during a 42–17 loss at the Denver Broncos in Week 2. He earned his first start of the season in Week 2 after Nolan Carroll suffered a concussion and was subsequently released on October 11, 2017. Brown started the next ten games, but was eventually benched for Chidobe Awuzie in Week 13 and remained a backup for the last five games of the regular season. On December 31, 2017, Brown recorded six combined tackles, deflected a pass, and made his first career sack in the Cowboys’ 6–0 win at the Philadelphia Eagles in Week 17. Brown sacked Eagles’ backup quarterback Nate Sudfeld for a 14-yard loss in the third quarter. Brown finished the 2017 NFL season with 56 combined tackles (47 solo), 11 pass deflections, two interceptions, and a sack in 16 games and ten starts.

2018

During training camp, Brown competed to be a starting cornerback against Byron Jones after Jones was moved from free safety to cornerback. Head coach Jason Garrett named Brown the third cornerback and first-team nickelback on the Cowboys’ depth chart to begin the regular season. He was listed on the depth chart behind Chidobe Awuzie and Byron Jones.

2019
Brown entered the 2019 season as the third cornerback on the depth chart behind Byron Jones and Chidobe Awuzie. In Week 11, Brown suffered a torn triceps and was ruled out the rest of the season. He finished the season playing in nine games with four starts, recording 17 tackles and five passes defensed.

2020
Brown re-signed with the Cowboys on a three-year contract on March 20, 2020. On September 19, 2020, he was placed on injured reserve with a rib injury. He was designated to return from injured reserve on October 7, and began practicing with the team again. He was activated on October 10.
In Week 5 against the New York Giants, Brown returned a fumble forced by teammate DeMarcus Lawrence on Daniel Jones for a 29-yard touchdown during the 37–34 win.
In Week 15 against the San Francisco 49ers, Brown recorded his first interception of the season off a pass thrown by Nick Mullens during the 41–33 win.

2021
Brown was named the starter at right cornerback, helping fill the void left by Chidobe Awuzie's departure in free agency. In a Week 12 36-33 Cowboys loss to the Las Vegas Raiders on Thanksgiving, Brown committed 4 defensive pass interference penalties for 91 yards, including one to set up the Raiders' game-winning field goal in overtime. He was the first player since at least 2000 to commit 4 pass interference penalties in a single game. However, Brown statistically had the best season of his career, as he accumulated career-highs with 16 starts, 79 tackles (third on the team), 3 interceptions (tied for second on the team), 17 passes defensed (second on the team), one forced fumble and one defensive touchdown.

2022
Brown returned as the Cowboys starting cornerback in 2022. He suffered a torn Achilles in Week 13 and was placed on season-ending injured reserve on December 10, 2022.

References

External links
Dallas Cowboys bio
Purdue Boilermakers bio

1993 births
Living people
American football cornerbacks
Dallas Cowboys players
Players of American football from Tampa, Florida
Purdue Boilermakers football players